The Guam Department of Corrections (DEPCOR, Chamorro: Depattamenton Mangngurihi) is an agency of the government of the United States territory of Guam that operates the island's correctional facilities.

The facility headquarters and main facility are in Mangilao.

The Guam Adult Correctional Facility (ACF) is the main correctional facility on Guam. The other facilities operated by DEPCOR include the Community Corrections Center (C3), the Hagåtña Detention Facility, and the Women's Facility. ACF, the women's facility, and the C3 are in Mangilao, while the Hagåtña Detention Facility is in Hagåtña.

References

External links

 Guam Department of Corrections

State corrections departments of the United States
Government of Guam